Legislative elections were held in French Polynesia on 21 April and 5 May 2013. The result was a victory for the Tahoera'a Huiraatira party, which won 38 of the 57 seats in the Assembly.

Electoral system
The election was held using a two round system. In the first round, parties were required to cross a threshold of 12.5% in order to participate in the second round, although parties receiving between 5% and 12.5% were allowed to form an alliance for the second round with a party that did qualify. In the second round, 38 seats are allocated by proportional representation, with the party receiving the most votes gaining an additional 19 seats.

Campaign
The Union for Democracy alliance was continued for the elections, consisting of Aia Api, Here Ai'a, Tavini Huiraatira, Tapura Amui No Raromatai and Tapura Amui No Te Faatereraa Manahune – Tuhaa Pae (a coalition between ULPD members and the Tapura Amui no Tuhaa Pae party). A new alliance, A Tia Porinetia, was formed for the election, which included To Tatou Aia and several smaller parties.

After being knocked out in the first round, Emile Vernier, leader of the Rally for the Respect of the Polynesian Population, gave his backing to A Tia Porinetia.

Results

See also
 List of members of the Assembly of French Polynesia (2013–2018)

References

2013 elections in Oceania
2013 elections in France
Elections in French Polynesia
2013 in French Polynesia
April 2013 events in Oceania
May 2013 events in Oceania